The seventh season of the American television series El Señor de los Cielos was confirmed by Telemundo in May 2018. It premiered on 14 October 2019, and ended on 31 January 2020.

The season stars Matías Novoa, Carmen Aub, Iván Arana, and Isabella Castillo as Casillas' dynasty. Along to Robinson Díaz, Guy Ecker, and Ninel Conde. And the inclusion of Danna García in the cast as main, and the promotion of Eduardo Santamarina as part of the main cast. Unlike the previous season, Lisa Owen, Alberto Guerra, Alejandro López, Fernando Noriega and Roberto Escobar were removed from the main cast and Rafael Amaya only appears as a special guest stars.

Plot 
In season seven, to avoid falling into the hands of the American Justice, Amado Leal "El Águila Azul", now Amado Casillas (Matías Novoa), has turned himself in to Bernardo Castillo (José Sedek), Secretary of Security of Mexico. The DEA commissioner, Joe Navarro (Guy Ecker), has made every attempt to achieve his extradition. What he does not know is that Baltazar Ojeda (Eduardo Santamarina), a CIA Agent, has the plan to eliminate Amado before, since he is the only one who can prove that within the organization in which both worked together, there is a scheme of corruption and murky management that endangers its existence within it and its freedom. He has already been transferred to a jail on the outskirts of the State of Mexico and is about to be taken to the airport, under strict security measures when the Casillas cartel tries to rescue him and Baltazar Ojeda himself tries to kill him. In the midst of this tension and in parallel, under the supervision of Doña Alba (Lisa Owen) and a specialized doctor, they try a risky procedure to revive Aurelio (Rafael Amaya).

Episodes

Cast and characters

Main 
 Matías Novoa as Amado Casillas "El Águila Azul"
 Carmen Aub as Rutila Casillas
 Iván Arana as Ismael Casillas
 Isabella Castillo as Diana Ahumada
 Robinson Díaz as Miltón Jiménez "El Cabo" / Pío José Valdivia
 Eduardo Santamarina as Balthazar Ojeda
 Guy Ecker as Joe Navarro
 Danna García as Violeta Estrella
 Ninel Conde as Evelina López

Recurring 
 Lisa Owen as Alba Casillas
 Manuel Landeta as Cecilio Guiterrez
 Alberto Guerra  as El Chema
 Alejandro López as El Súper Javi
 Nacho Fresneda as Renzo Volpi
 Fernando Noriega as Eutemio Flores "El Rojo"
 Julián Román as Joaquín Estrella
 Thali García as Berenice Ahumada
 Dayana Garroz as Ámbar Maldonado
 Alan Slim as Jaime Ernesto Rosales
 Claudia Lobo as Esther
 Alosian Vivancos as Dylan Gutiérrez "Dj Dylan"
 Marisela Berti as Edith Guzmán
 Daniel Martínez as Guillermo Colón
 José Sedek as Bernardo Castillo
 Roberto Escobar as Comandante José Valdés
 Athina Klioum as Athina
 Coraima Torres as Rita Peña
 Elsy Reyes as Carla Uzcátegui
 Mabel Moreno as Alejandra 
 Camila Jurado as Ángela 
 Karla Carrillo as Corina Saldaña / Salma Vidal
 Karen Sandoval as Laura
 Denia Agalianou as Dalila Zuc 
 Leonardo Álvarez as Leonardo Castaño
 Daniel Martínez Campos as Arístides Istúriz
 Renata Manterola as Luzma Casillas
 David Ponce as José Manrique "Skinny"
 Carlos Puente as Pompeyo
 Fernando Banda as El Vitaminas
 Daniel Rascón as El Toro
 Antonio López Torres as El Pulque
 Alejandro Navarrete as El Zopilote
 Alex Walerstein as Paul "El Greñas"
 Alejandro Félix as Chatarrero
 Carlos Balderrama as José Manuel Castillo "Manny"
 Rubén Arciniegas as Samario
 Gabriel Bonilla as Isidro Casillas
 Yannis Spaliaras as Nikos 
 Christina Sotiriou as Irene
 Plutarco Haza as Dalvio Navarrete "El Ingeniero"
 Lupita Jones as Amaranta Reyes

Guest stars 
 Rafael Amaya as Aurelio Casillas

Reception 
The series premiered on 14 October 2019 with a total of 1.99 million viewers and 1.1 million viewers adults 18–49 years. Surpassing El Dragón: Return of a Warrior of Univision and becoming the most watched program during the year in Telemundo, only above La Reina del Sur, despite having had a successful premiere; the series failed to reach two million viewers as in past seasons. After actor Rafael Amaya left of the series, the audience began to decrease markedly in each episode, before this, several followers of the series threatened Telemundo with stop watching the series.

Production 
On 10 May 2018, Telemundo announced that the series has been renewed for a seventh season. The production of the season began on 27 May 2019 in Mexico, and concluded in September 2019. The season is produced by Argos Comunicación for Telemundo Global Studios, and it was recorded entirely in Mexico, and some places in Greece.

Casting 
After having been present at the Telemundo Upfront for the 2019-2020 television season, and having been present in the season trailer. Gala Montes, who previously participated in two previous seasons playing Luzma Casillas, confirmed that she left the series due to incoformity with the script of her character. 
On 21 June 2019, it was confirmed that Venezuelan actress Coraima Torres would be part of the season. On 16 July 2019, Jesús Moré who played Omar Terán confirmed his departure from the series and said "I think it's a good decision, I think the character gave what he had to give in the sixth season. What not did Omar Terán? I touched some climax peaks, of vices ... I think the character gave many things and as an actor he enriched me infinitely." On 24 July 2019, Matías Novoa confirmed his participation in the season together with Rafael Amaya, who had left the series in the previous season. 
Later after having started the production of the season, Amaya stopped appearing on the set of the production, something that Telemundo did not clarify. On 11 August 2019, Plutarco Haza's return to the season was confirmed. On 14 August 2019, People en Español magazine confirmed that Isabella Castillo, Carmen Aub, Karla Carrillo, Iván Arana, Fernando Noriega, Alejandro López, Álex Walerstein, Ninel Conde, Dayana Garroz, and Alberto Guerra would be back in the season.

On 16 September 2019, People en Español magazine reported that Danna García would join the cast of the season as Violeta, along to Rubén Arciniegas. Subsequently, on 17 September 2019, the magazine confirmed the return of Eduardo Santamarina, Robinson Díaz, and Fernando Noriega to the season, as well as the inclusion of new characters such as Manuel Landeta, and Julián Román among others. Although it was confirmed that Rafael Amaya would be in the seventh season, during the season's premiere; Telemundo confirmed that his character died.

Promotion 
On 9 September 2019, Telemundo began promoting the seventh season through its official Instagram account. However, the teaser that lasts less than a minute does not clearly show if Rafael Amaya will be present during the season. On 12 September 2019, the first advance of the season was shown, where Amaya appears.

References 

El Señor de los Cielos
2019 American television seasons
2019 Mexican television seasons
2020 American television seasons
2020 Mexican television seasons